Nitsche is a surname. Notable people with the surname include:

 Dominik Nitsche, German professional poker player
 Joachim Nitsche (1926–1996), German mathematician
 Erik Nitsche, American graphic designer
 Francisco Nitsche, Chilean footballer
 Franz Nitsche, Austrian rower
 Hinrich Nitsche, German zoologist
 Paul Nitsche (1876–1948), German psychiatrist executed for crimes against humanity 
 Robert Lehmann-Nitsche, German anthropologist

See also
 Friedrich Nietzsche, whose last name is sometimes misspelt "Nitsche".
 Nietzsche (disambiguation)

Surnames from given names